The Bob Dylan England Tour 1965 was a concert tour by American singer-songwriter Bob Dylan during late April and early May 1965. The tour was documented by filmmaker D. A. Pennebaker, who used the footage of the tour in his documentary Dont Look Back.

Tour dates

Set lists 
As Dylan was still playing exclusively folk music live, much of the material performed during this tour was written pre-1965. Each show was divided into two halves, with seven songs performed during the first, and eight during the second. The set consisted of two songs from The Freewheelin' Bob Dylan, three from The Times They Are a-Changin', three from Another Side of Bob Dylan, a comic-relief concert staple; "If You Gotta Go, Go Now", issued as a single in Europe, and six songs off his then-recent album, Bringing It All Back Home, including the second side in its entirety.

 First half
"The Times They Are a-Changin'"
"To Ramona"
"Gates of Eden"
"If You Gotta Go, Go Now (or Else You Got to Stay All Night)"
"It's Alright, Ma (I'm Only Bleeding)"
"Love Minus Zero/No Limit"
"Mr. Tambourine Man"

Second Half
"Talkin' World War III Blues"
"Don't Think Twice, It's All Right"
"With God on Our Side"
"She Belongs to Me"
"It Ain't Me Babe"
"The Lonesome Death of Hattie Carroll"
"All I Really Want to Do"
"It's All Over Now, Baby Blue"

Set list per Olof Bjorner.

References 

Howard Sounes: Down the Highway. The Life of Bob Dylan.. 2001.

External links 
 Bjorner's Still on the Road 1965: Tour dates & set lists

Bob Dylan concert tours
1965 concert tours
Concert tours of the United Kingdom
1965 in England
April 1965 events in the United Kingdom
May 1965 events in the United Kingdom